Lloyd Williams is a former Australian rules footballer who played with Collingwood in the Victorian Football League (VFL).

See also
 Australian football at the 1956 Summer Olympics

Notes

External links 		

		
		

1934 births
Australian rules footballers from Victoria (Australia)		
Collingwood Football Club players
Ivanhoe Amateurs Football Club players
Living people